The Oliver H. Bair Funeral Home is a historic building in Philadelphia, Pennsylvania.

The five-story building, built in 1907 from the designs of architect John T. Windrim, was listed on the National Register of Historic Places in 1982. It was added to the Philadelphia Register of Historic Places on February 8, 1995.

The building is now occupied by luxury department clothing store Boyds Philadelphia. The funeral home company has moved to Upper Darby, Pennsylvania.

References

External links

 NRHP nomination form
 Listing at Philadelphia Architects and Buildings
 The Oliver H. Bair Company records, which contains burial records from 1920 to 1980, are available for research use at the Historical Society of Pennsylvania

Buildings and structures on the National Register of Historic Places in Philadelphia
Renaissance Revival architecture in Pennsylvania
Buildings and structures completed in 1907
Philadelphia Register of Historic Places
Rittenhouse Square, Philadelphia